Opisthocentrinae is a subfamily of marine ray-finned fishes, classified within the family Stichaeidae, the pricklebacks or shannies. These fishes are found in the North Pacific Occean.

Taxonomy
Opisthocentrinae was first put forward as a subfamily in 1898 by the American ichthyologists David Starr Jordan and Barton Warren Evermann. The 5th edition of Fishes of the World places this subfamily in the family Stichaeidae but other authorities treat this taxon as valid family within the suborder Zoarcoidei, either in the Scorpaeniformes, or the Perciformes. The name of the subfamily is taken from its type genus Opisthocentrus which is a combination of opistho, meaning "behind", and kentron, which means "thorn" or "spine", an allusion to the spines on the 11th and 12th rays in the dorsal fin of O. ocellatus.

Etymology
Opisthocentrus is a combination of opistho, meaning "behind", and kentron, which means "thorn" or "spine", an allusion to the spines on the 11th and 12th rays in the dorsal fin of O. ocellatus.

Genera
The subfamily contains the following genera:

Characteristics
Opisthocentrinae fishes are characterised by having elongate bodies which are relatively deep. They do not have any appendages in the skin of the head. The anal fin has with 1 or 2 spines at its anterior end and the pectoral fins are lareg, containing between 12 and 21 fin rays. The small pelvic fins have a single spine and 3 soft rays, although in some taxa these may be vestigial or absent, e.g. in Kasatkia. The head can be completed clothed in scales, there may only be scales on the cheek or it may be naked. The sensory canals on the head are well developed and the lateral line system on the body consists of mid flank and dorsal lines comprising superficial neuromasts. The gill membranes have a wide join and are not attached to the isthmus.

Distribution and habitat
Opisthocentrinae fishes are found in the North Pacific Ocean off both Asia and North America. They are found from costal algal beds out to the edge of the continental shelf.Generally, little is known about their biology.

References

Stichaeidae
 
Taxa described in 1898
Fish subfamilies